Alfonso Rivas III (born September 13, 1996) is a Mexican-American professional baseball first baseman and outfielder in the San Diego Padres organization. He has played in Major League Baseball (MLB) for the Chicago Cubs from 2021 to 2022.

Amateur career
Rivas was born on the side of the road along Interstate 805 and raised in Tijuana before moving to Chula Vista, California when he was in the fourth grade. Rivas attended La Jolla Country Day School in La Jolla, California, graduating in 2015. He enrolled at the University of Arizona where he played college baseball. In 2016 he batted .247/.329/.332. In 2017, as a sophomore, he played in 58 games and batted .371 with seven home runs, 64 RBIs, and 54 runs. He played in the Cape Cod Baseball League for the Yarmouth–Dennis Red Sox that summer. As a junior in 2018, Rivas appeared in 56 games in which he hit .347 with seven home runs and 52 RBIs. Following the season's end, he was selected by the Oakland Athletics in the fourth round of the 2018 Major League Baseball draft.

Professional career

Oakland Athletics
Rivas signed with Oakland and made his professional debut with the Vermont Lake Monsters of the Class A Short Season New York–Penn League, with whom he hit .285 with one home run, 28 RBIs, and 16 doubles over 61 games. To begin the 2019 season, he was assigned to the Stockton Ports of the Class A-Advanced California League (with whom he was named an All-Star) before being promoted to the Las Vegas Aviators of the Class AAA Pacific Coast League in late August. Over 122 games between the two clubs, he slashed .292/.387/.423 with nine home runs, sixty RBIs, and 26 doubles.

Chicago Cubs
On January 13, 2020, Rivas was traded to the Chicago Cubs in exchange for Tony Kemp. He did not play a minor league game in 2020 due to the cancellation of the season caused by the COVID-19 pandemic. He was assigned to the Iowa Cubs of the Triple-A East to begin the 2021 season. He missed nearly all of May and a majority of June due to injury.

On August 28, 2021, the Cubs selected Rivas' contract and promoted him to the major leagues. At the time of his promotion, he was slashing .284/.405/.411 with four home runs, 32 RBIs, and 13 doubles over 58 games with Iowa. He made his MLB debut the next day starting at first base versus the Chicago White Sox at Wrigley Field, collecting two hits in three at-bats as the Cubs lost 13-1. On September 14, he hit his first MLB home run against Kyle Gibson of the Philadelphia Phillies. On September 21, he was placed on the injured list with a finger injury, thus ending his first MLB season prematurely; over 44 at-bats with the Cubs, Rivas batted .318 with one home run and three RBIs.

In 2022 with the Cubs he batted .235/.322/.307. He was designated for assignment on December 23, 2022. He was released on January 5, 2023.

San Diego Padres
On January 12, 2023, Rivas signed a minor league contract with the San Diego Padres organization.

References

External links

Arizona Wildcats bio

1996 births
Living people
Sportspeople from Chula Vista, California
Baseball players from California
American baseball players of Mexican descent
Major League Baseball first basemen
Chicago Cubs players
Arizona Wildcats baseball players
Yarmouth–Dennis Red Sox players
Vermont Lake Monsters players
Stockton Ports players
Las Vegas Aviators players
Mesa Solar Sox players
Iowa Cubs players